Paul Heinrich Ritter von Groth (23 June 1843 – 2 December 1927) was a German mineralogist.  His most important contribution to science was his systematic classification of minerals based on their chemical compositions and crystal structures.

Biography

He was born at Magdeburg, and educated at Freiberg, Dresden and Berlin, and received the doctorate degree in 1868. After lecturing at the Freiberg mining school and at the University of Berlin, in 1872 he became professor of mineralogy at Strasbourg.  In 1883, he was appointed professor of mineralogy and curator of minerals in the Deutsches Museum in Munich.

He died in Munich.

Work
He carried out extensive research on crystals and minerals, and also on rocks.  von Groth published Tabellarische Übersicht der einfachen Mineralien (1874-1898) and Physikalische Krystallographie (1876-1895, ed. 4, 1905), the latter of which was influential with the acceptance of crystallographic methods in the field of organic chemistry. In 1877 he founded the journal Zeitschrift für Krystallographie und Mineralogie, and subsequently served as its editor until 1920. In 1883, Groth compiled a monumental five-volume collection entitled Chemische Kristallographie, which contained crystalline morphology and physical property data on thousands of substances.

By Groth's time, Dalton's atomic theory was already well established.  In 1888, Groth was the first to suggest the possibility that spherical atoms reside at equivalent positions of space lattices, which gave a physical significance to this still somewhat abstract idea of the regular and symmetric partitioning of space.  The German physicist Leonhard Sohncke (1842–1897) had previously derived the 65 chiral space groups (i.e. those lacking an inversion center, mirror planes, or improper axes of rotation that invert the handedness of a crystal).  The mathematical descriptions of the complete set of 230 space groups, including their symmetry elements, were thereafter derived independently by Schönflies, Fedorov, and Barlow.  Finally, in 1922, Ralph Walter Graystone Wyckoff (1897–1994) authored The Analytical Expression of the Results of the Theory of Space Groups, a book which contained, among other things, tables with the positional coordinates, both general and special, permitted by the symmetry elements.

Publications

as author
Elemente der physikalischen und chemischen Krystallographie (R. Oldenbourg, 1921)
Physikalische Krystallographie und Einleitung in die krystallographische Kenntniss der wichtigsten Subtanzen (W. Engelmann, 1905)
Ueber die Molekularbeschaffenheit der Krystalle. Festrede gehalten in der öffentlichen Sitzung der k.b. Akademie der Wissenschaften zu München zur Feier des einhundert und neunundzwanzigsten Stiftungstages am 28 März 1888 (München, 1888)
Über das studium der Mineralogie auf den Deutschen Hochschulen (London, Trübner & Co, 1875)

References

1843 births
1927 deaths
German mineralogists
Wollaston Medal winners
Foreign Members of the Royal Society
Foreign associates of the National Academy of Sciences
Academic staff of the University of Strasbourg
Corresponding members of the Saint Petersburg Academy of Sciences
Honorary Members of the Russian Academy of Sciences (1917–1925)
Members of the Royal Society of Sciences in Uppsala